Ponta Grossa Esporte Clube, commonly known as Ponta Grossa, was a Brazilian football club based in Ponta Grossa, Paraná state. They competed in the Série C once.

History
The club was founded on June 30, 1994, by a former president of another Ponta Grossa club, Operário Ferroviário Esporte Clube. They competed in the Série C in 1997, when they were eliminated in the Second Stage of the competition. Due to financial problems, in 2003 the club sold its spot in the Campeonato Paranaense to ADAP, competing in that season's competition as ADAP/Ponta Grossa. The club folded in the same year.

Stadium
Ponta Grossa Esporte Clube played their home games at Estádio Germano Krüger. The stadium has a maximum capacity of 8,620 people.

References

Association football clubs established in 1994
Association football clubs disestablished in 2003
Defunct football clubs in Paraná (state)
1994 establishments in Brazil
2003 disestablishments in Brazil